Cyperus confertus, also called the West Indian flatsedge is a species of sedge that is native to northern parts of South America.

See also 
 List of Cyperus species

References 

confertus
Plants described in 1788
Taxa named by Olof Swartz
Flora of the Bahamas
Flora of Colombia
Flora of Cuba
Flora of the Dominican Republic
Flora of Haiti
Flora of Jamaica
Flora of Aruba
Flora of the Galápagos Islands
Flora of Puerto Rico
Flora of Venezuela
Flora of Trinidad
Flora without expected TNC conservation status